José F.F. Mendes (born in Porto) is a Portuguese physicist (statistical physics) and professor of physics, best known for his work and contributions to the field of network theory.Graduated from University of Porto in 1987. He earned a PhD in March 1995 from the same University under the direction of Eduardo Lage, the title of the thesis was "Dynamics of spins systems".

Mendes was head of the Physics Department from December 2004 to February 2010 at University of Aveiro. From October 2009 to February 2010 he was director of the Associated Laboratory of the Institute of Nanostructures, Nanomodelling and Nanofabrication (I3N).

From February 2010 to February 2018 served as vice-rector for Research and Doctoral Studies at the University of Aveiro.

He is currently the President of the Complex Systems Society  (2021 - ...).

Academic career

In 1983 he entered the University of Porto and graduated in physics in 1987. He gained his master's diploma in 1990. In 1987 he was an assistant in the Department of Physics, University of Porto. As a graduate student he visited as several universities as a researcher, including Oxford, Geneva, the City University of New York, and São Paulo. After finishing his Ph.D., he became an assistant professor in the same department. In 1996 he did a one year postdoctoral fellowship in Boston University under the supervision of Sid Redner. In 2002 did his "habilitation". In 2002, he became an associate professor at University of Aveiro and in 2005 professor. He was invited as professor by Henri Poincaré University (Nancy), Universidade Federal Minas Gerais (UFMG) and Visiting Researcher at Consiglio Nazionale Delle Ricerche (Pisa), Nanyang Technological University (NTU), EPFL (Lausanne) and ETH (Zurich).

Research
Mendes is known for his research on complex networks, and in particular for work on random graph theory, phase transitions, multiplex networks, percolation theory, and network epidemiology. He proposed with collaborators the idea of aging on networks, generalization of preferential attachment, pseudo-fractal networks, hybrid phase transitions, explosive phase transition nature, spectral analysis, k-core, and random walks on networks.

Awards

Prize Gulbenkian Ciência (2004).
Inducted member of Academia Europaea in 2012. 
Member of American Physical Society (APS) (2017). 
Member of Sociedade Portuguesa de Fisica.
Member of The Complex Systems Society.
Fellow of the Network Science Society (2019): "For profound contributions to network science that includes elucidating the consequences of preferential attachment, node aging, eigenvalue spectra, and critical phenomena in complex networks."
Fellow of the American Physical Society in 2020.
Litoral Awards Prize "Research" (2020)
Senior Prize, Complex Systems Society (2020): "for his seminal contributions and the many further developments of the theory of Complex Networks."
"Hero of Physics", Prize from Physics Department, elected by students (2021)

Selected publications

Books

 S.N. Dorogovtsev and J.F.F. Mendes, "The Nature of Complex Networks", Oxford University Press (2022) 
 G.J. Baxter, R.A. da Costa, S.N. Dorogovtsev, J.F.F. Mendes, "Weak Multiplex Percolation", Cambridge University Press (2021) 
 Dorogovtsev, SN and Mendes JFF, Evolution of Networks: From Biological Nets to the Internet and WWW, Oxford University Press, Oxford 2003, 2014;  (hardcover)

Articles
 ;
 ;
 R. A. da Costa, S. N. Dorogovtsev, A. V. Goltsev, J. F. F. Mendes, "Explosive Percolation" Transition is Actually Continuous, Phys. Rev. Lett. 105, 255701 (2010);

References

External links
 Home Page

1962 births
Living people
People from Porto
Mendes, Jose F. F.
Network scientists